Dipeptidase M may refer to one of two enzymes:
X-His dipeptidase
Met-X dipeptidase